Oracle ZFS is a proprietary file system and logical volume manager. ZFS is scalable, and includes extensive protection against data corruption, support for high storage capacities, efficient data compression, integration of the concepts of filesystem and volume management, snapshots and copy-on-write clones, continuous integrity checking and automatic repair, RAID-Z, native NFSv4 ACLs, and can be very precisely configured. 

ZFS is a registered trademark belonging to Oracle.

History

Implementations

Solaris 10
In update 2 and later, ZFS is part of Sun's own Solaris 10 operating system and is thus available on both SPARC and x86-based systems.

Solaris 11
After Oracle's Solaris 11 Express release, the OS/Net consolidation (the main OS code) was made proprietary and closed-source, and further ZFS upgrades and implementations inside Solaris (such as encryption) are not compatible with other non-proprietary implementations which use previous versions of ZFS.

When creating a new ZFS pool, to retain the ability to use access the pool from other non-proprietary Solaris-based distributions, it is recommended to upgrade to Solaris 11 Express from OpenSolaris (snv_134b), and thereby stay at ZFS version 28.

Future development
On September 2, 2017, Simon Phipps reported that Oracle had laid off virtually all  of its Solaris core development staff, interpreting it as a sign that Oracle no longer intends to support future development of the platform.

Version history

References

External links

Compression file systems
Disk file systems
Formerly free software
Oracle software
RAID
Volume manager